Bhawnathpur is one of the administrative blocks of Garhwa district, Jharkhand state, India.

About Bhawnathpur Garhwa Jharkhand 
Bhawnathpur a Taluka/Block, close to Ranka, is located 40 km from Garhwa. It's well covered by Vodafone, Airtel, Uninor, Reliance, BSNL, Aircel, Idea, Airtel 3G, like cellular networks. SAIL (RMD) has limestone and dolomite mines in Bhawanathpur.

Languages
Languages spoken here include Asuri, an Austroasiatic language spoken by approximately 17 000 in India, largely in the southern part of Palamu; and Bhojpuri, a tongue in the Bihari language group with almost 40 000 000 speakers, written in both the Devanagari and Kaithi scripts.

Facilities
A small market called Bhawnathpur bazar is situated in middle of the block.

See also
Garhwa district
Jharkhand

References

Garhwa district
Community development blocks in Jharkhand
Community development blocks in Garhwa district
Cities and towns in Garhwa district